Kenneth Scott Painter (28 March 1935 – 14 May 2016) was deputy keeper of Greek and Roman antiquities at the British Museum and an authority on Roman and late antique silver. He was vice-president of the British Archaeological Association in 1997 and a trustee of Oxford Archaeology. He received a DLitt from Oxford University in 2004.

Selected publications
The Mildenhall Treasure: Roman Silver from East Anglia. British Museum Publications, London, 1977. 
The Water Newton early Christian silver. British Museum Publications, London, 1977. 
 
The Insula of the Menander at Pompeii: Volume IV: The Silver Treasure. Oxford University Press, Oxford, 2001. 
Late Roman Silver. The Traprain Treasure in Context. Society of Antiquaries of Scotland, 2013.

References 

1935 births
2016 deaths
English curators
English archaeologists
Employees of the British Museum
People educated at Bristol Grammar School
Alumni of Worcester College, Oxford
People from Cheltenham